James Guy may refer to:
 James Guy (Australian politician) (1860–1921), Australian politician from Tasmania
 James Guy (British politician) (1894–?), Scottish politician, MP for Edinburgh Central 1931–1941
 James Guy (swimmer) (born 1995), British swimmer
 James Lee Guy (born 1968), American actor in film and television in China